Kristian Doolittle (born October 19, 1997) is an American professional basketball player for the Iwate Big Bulls of the Japanese B.League. He played college basketball for the Oklahoma Sooners.

High school career
Doolittle played basketball for Edmond Memorial High School in Edmond, Oklahoma. In his freshman season, he played with his future college teammate Jordan Woodard and won the Class 6A state title. As a sophomore, Doolittle averaged 14.6 points and 8.3 rebounds per game. In his junior season, he averaged 17.5 points and a Class 6A-high 12 rebounds per game, earning first-team all-conference, The Oklahoman Super Five and Class 6A all-state honors. 

As a senior, Doolittle averaged 24 points, 13 rebounds and five assists per game and led Memorial to the Class 6A state quarterfinals. He was named to the USA Today All-USA Oklahoma first team. Doolittle finished his career as his school's all-time leader in points, rebounds and games played. A four-star recruit and the top player from Oklahoma in the 2016 class, he committed to play college basketball when he was a junior in high school.

College career
As a freshman, Doolittle averaged 9.1 points and 6.2 rebounds per game, making 25 starts. He was suspended for the first semester of his sophomore year due to an academic issue. Doolittle averaged 2.9 points and 4.3 rebounds per game as a sophomore. As a junior, Doolittle was named to the Third Team All-Big 12 and Big 12 Most Improved Player. He averaged 11.3 points and 7.1 rebounds per game. Doolittle was suspended the first game of his senior season by the NCAA due to participating in an unsanctioned summer league game. On November 18, 2019, Doolittle was named Big 12 player of the week after contributing 19 points, a career-high 16 rebounds, and four assists in a win over Oregon State. He earned his second conference player of the week honors on December 23 after posting 21 points and 15 rebounds against Creighton. Doolittle reached the 1,000 point milestone on February 1, 2020, in an 82–69 win over Oklahoma State. On February 17, he earned his third Big 12 player of the week honors after posting 20 points, six rebounds, three steals and three assists in a win against Iowa State followed by 27 points and 12 rebounds against Kansas. At the conclusion of the regular season, Doolittle was named to the First Team All-Big 12. He averaged 15.8 points and 8.9 rebounds per game as a senior, shooting 44.1 percent from the floor, and had 10 double-doubles.

Professional career

Vaqueros de Bayamón (2020–2021)
On October 16, 2020, Doolittle signed with Vaqueros de Bayamón of the Baloncesto Superior Nacional.

Canton Charge (2021)
On February 6, 2021, the Canton Charge of the NBA G League acquired Doolittle from the available player pool.

Return to Vaqueros de Bayamón (2021)
On June 17, 2021, Doolittle returned to Vaqueros de Bayamón. He averaged 12 points, 7 rebounds and 3 assists per game.

Hapoel Eilat (2021–2022)
On October 16, 2021, Doolittle signed a one year deal with Hapoel Eilat of the Israeli Basketball Premier League, replacing the injured Ben Carter.

Iwate Big Bulls(2022-)
On June 1, 2022, Doolittle signed with Iwate Big Bulls of the Japanese B.League.

Career statistics

College

|-
| style="text-align:left;"| 2016–17 
| style="text-align:left;"| Oklahoma 
|| 31 || 25 || 25.1 || .394 || .395 || .811 || 6.2 || 1.1 || .6 || .3 || 9.1
|-
| style="text-align:left;"| 2017–18 
| style="text-align:left;"| Oklahoma 
|| 22 || 6 || 17.0 || .371 || .500 || .615 || 4.3 || .6 || .4 || .1 || 2.9
|-
| style="text-align:left;"| 2018–19
| style="text-align:left;"| Oklahoma 
|| 34 || 32 || 29.1 || .502 || .000 || .775 || 7.1 || 1.6 || .9 || .5 || 11.3
|-
| style="text-align:left;"| 2019–20
| style="text-align:left;"| Oklahoma
|| 29 || 29 || 32.5 || .441 || .375 || .793 || 8.9 || 2.0 || 1.3 || .4 || 15.8
|- class="sortbottom"
| style="text-align:center;" colspan="2"| Career
|| 116 || 92 || 26.6 || .444 || .374 || .780 || 6.8 || 1.4 || .8 || .4 || 10.2

Personal life
Doolittle's older brother, Kameron, played college football for Oklahoma State at the wide receiver position. His father, Dwayne, is a longtime football and basketball referee.

References

External links
Oklahoma Sooners bio

1997 births
Living people
African-American basketball players
American men's basketball players
Basketball players from Oklahoma
Edmond Memorial High School alumni
Iwate Big Bulls players
Oklahoma Sooners men's basketball players
Small forwards
Sportspeople from Edmond, Oklahoma